Kelling Quags is a nature reserve near Kelling, Norfolk. It is 5.7 ha (14 acres) in extent. It is managed by the Norfolk Ornithological Association as a coastal fresh marsh.  It consists of pools and wet grazing marshes behind a shingle ridge. It was purchased by the NOA in 1984.

It was designated as a Site of Special Scientific Interest (SSSI) in 1954, and in 1986 it was subsumed into the  North Norfolk Coast Site of Special Scientific Interest. The larger area is now additionally protected through Natura 2000 (SPA) and Ramsar listings, and is part of the Norfolk Coast Area of Outstanding Natural Beauty (AONB).

References

Cited texts
 

Sites of Special Scientific Interest in Norfolk
Coastal features of Norfolk
Birdwatching sites in England
Nature reserves in Norfolk